Mickey Hot Springs is a small hot spring system in southeastern Oregon, United States. The hot springs are located at the north end of the Alvord Desert just east of Steens Mountain and north of the 2-6 Hot Springs which are much larger but less known. There are several natural bubbling mudpots and steam vents. The system contains at least 60 vents, 11 of which are dry. The hydrothermal system may be in its waning stages of existence.

The majority of the vents are far too hot for bathing. The water pH is neutral to slightly alkaline.
An ecosystem of thermophilic organisms exist in the springs, separated by temperature strata.

References

External links 
 Extent and location of the geothermal aquifer in the Alvord Basin, Harney County, Oregon: A study based on Strontium Isotope Geochemistry of rocks and fluids

Hot springs of Oregon
Bodies of water of Harney County, Oregon